The Gardenia Stakes was an American Thoroughbred horse race run at Garden State Park Racetrack near Cherry Hill, New Jersey. Created in 1955, the event was the world's richest race for two-year-old fillies with a total purse of US$130,300 in its inaugural year. It was the counterpart to the Garden State Futurity for two-year-old male horses. 

The Gardenia Stakes was placed on hiatus after the 1972 edition. It would be revived in 1980 at the Meadowlands Racetrack where it would be run thru to the final running in 1991. In 1990 only, the race was run on Turf.

Historical notes
The inaugural running of the Gardenia Stakes took on a muddy track place on October 15, 1955 and was won by Nasrina who would be recognized as that year's American Co-Champion Two-Year-Old Filly. The substantial purse, as well as the Gardenia's place on the American racing calendar late in the year, would see the event won by fillies that would be voted National Champion honors for thirteen of its first eighteen runnings from 1955 thru 1972. Until 1970 there were three different racing organizations picking an annual National Champion and only two Gardenia winners prior to 1971, Castle Forbes in 1963 and Gallant Bloom in 1968, were not unanimous choices.

Gardenia winner Numbered Account, owned by Ogden Phipps and trained by Roger Laurin was the first Eclipse Award recipient in the two-year-old filly category. The following year, the future Hall of Fame inductee La Prevoyante won the Gardenia. Owned by Canadian J. Louis Lévesque and trained by Yonnie Starr, it was her final start of 1972 and marked her twelfth straight win without a loss.  La Prevoyante would prove to be the last Gardenia winner to earn American Champion Two Year-Old Filly honors. In that year's voting for American Horse of the Year, La Prevoyante was second to Secretariat.

Flawlessly, a daughter of 1978 U.S. Triple Crown winner Affirmed, won the 1990 Gardenia and went on to a stellar career that saw her inducted into the U. S. Racing Hall of Fame in 2004.

Records
Speed record:
 1:43.00 @ 1-1/16 miles: Princess Rooney (1982)

Most wins by a jockey:
 3 - Bill Shoemaker (1960, 1961, 1964)

Most wins by a trainer:
 3 - Casey Hayes (1961, 1966, 1967)
 3 - Woody Stephens (1985, 1988, 1989)

Most wins by an owner:
 3 - Meadow Stable (1961, 1966, 1967)

Winners

* † Romanita finished first, but was disqualified and set back to third.

References

Discontinued horse races
Horse races in the United States
Horse races in New Jersey
Flat horse races for two-year-old fillies
Previously graded stakes races in the United States
Garden State Park Racetrack
Meadowlands Racetrack
Recurring sporting events established in 1955
Recurring sporting events disestablished in 1992